Muzaffarabad Tigers is a franchise cricket team that represents Muzaffarabad in the Kashmir Premier League. Mohammad Hafeez was the captain and Misbah-ul-Haq was the coach of the team. Mohammad Hafeez was announced as Muzaffarabad Tigers’ icon player.

Squad

Season standings

Points table

League fixtures and results

Statistics

Most runs 

Source: Cricinfo

Most wickets 

Source: Cricinfo

References

Kashmir Premier League (Pakistan)